Three Poplars in Plyushchikha is a 1968 romantic drama feature film directed by Tatyana Lioznova based on the story by Alexander Borschagovsky "Three Poplars in Shabolovka". The film was a box-office success, it was seen by 26 million people in the USSR.

Plot
From a village to Moscow comes a married woman and mother of two children Nyura to sell home-made ham. And the first person she meets is an intelligent taxi driver Sasha, who must pick her up to her in-law; her husband's sister, who lives near the cafe "Three Poplars" at Plyushchikha. This random meeting brings the strangers together and forces them to take a fresh look at their lives. But unfortunately, due to external circumstances continuation of this connection does not develop.

Cast
 Tatiana Doronina as Nyura
 Oleg Yefremov as Sasha, taxi driver
 Hikmat Latypov as grandfather Sadyk
 Vyacheslav Shalevich as Grisha, Nyura's husband
 Valentina Telegina as Fedosiya Ivanovna
 Nikolay Smirnov as uncle Egor
 Alevtina Rumyantseva  as Nina, Nyura's sister-in-law
 Viktor Sergachyov as Nina's fiancé
 Georgy Svetlani as shepherd
 Galya Belykh as Galya, daughter Nyura (credited as Valya Belykh)
 Sergei Morozov as Sergei, Nyura's
 Yugenia Poplavskaja as girl in a taxi
 Yakov Lenz as  old man in the queue

Production 
The story by Alexander Borschagovsky was called "Three Poplars at Shabolovka", and initially this was what the film was to be called. However Shabolovka had already become associated with television, and the motion picture was not about the TV industry. Therefore, director Tatyana Lioznova decided to change the name of the movie and the author gave his consent.

Field shooting of "Three Poplars at Plyuschikha" took place in the capital's streets and in the village Smedovo, Ozyory, Moscow Oblast.

Scenes in Nina's apartment were filmed not far from Plyuschikha in the apartment which has the address Rostov embankment, №5. At the request of the filmmakers, the tenants of the apartment left for their dacha, leaving it at full disposal of the crew.

Rustic interiors were filmed in Mosfilm pavilions and the "road" episodes - in a specially reserved diesel locomotive passenger car.

The car in which Sasha drives Nyura is GAZ M21 Volga which belongs to Mosfilm and was used for many of the studio's pictures. It is currently on display at the Mosfilm museum.

Interesting Facts
Nikolai Rybnikov auditioned for the role of Sasha
In 2011 Channel One Russia aired a colorized version of the film.
The song Tenderness composed by Aleksandra Pakhmutova for the film became very popular and has been covered by many artists.

Awards
The film received an award from the International Catholic Organization for Cinema at the Mar del Plata International Film Festival.
The actress Tatiana Doronina received an award for Best Actress at the All-Union Film Festival.
For her acting in the film Tatiana Doronina was voted as best actress of 1968 by the readers of "Soviet Screen".

References in other films
In the film Gentlemen of Fortune a man nicknamed as Sad Sack says: "We are sitting here like three poplars in Plyushcikha!" – when the three prison escapees are sitting in an empty sports stadium. After this film, the phrase "Like three poplars in Plyushcikha" became a famous quote.

References

External links

Gorky Film Studio films
Soviet romantic drama films
1968 romantic drama films
Films directed by Tatyana Lioznova
Russian romantic drama films
1968 films